"Everybody" is a centrist political party in Chile.

The party was founded in 2015 by the creator of Start-up Chile, Nicolás Shea, and the former executive director of Chile 21, Ángeles Fernández. "Everybody" defines itself as a catch-all and transversal party. It was registered on August 19, 2015, and reportedly legalized on June 7, 2016.

For the 2017 presidential election, "Everybody" presented Nicolás Shea and television host Nicolás Larraín as presidential candidates, but neither were registered and the party was left without a candidate for the first round. On August 7, 2017, it joined the Amplitude and Citizens parties in the Sumemos coalition.

Presidential candidates 
The following is a list of the presidential candidates supported by the Everybody Party. (Information gathered from the Archive of Chilean Elections). 
2017: none

References

External links
Everybody Party 

2015 establishments in Chile
Political parties established in 2015
Political parties in Chile